The Indochinese barbet (Psilopogon annamensis), also called Annam barbet, is a bird belonging to the family Megalaimidae.  It inhabits tropical and subtropical forests. It is found in Laos, Vietnam and Cambodia. It used to be considered a subspecies of the black-browed barbet.

References

Indochinese barbet
Birds of Laos
Birds of Vietnam
Indochinese barbet